Institute of Philosophy and Sociology of the Polish Academy of Sciences is a scientific Institute of the Polish Academy of Sciences, based in the Palace of Technology in Warsaw. Its primary aim is to conduct "advanced" studies in philosophy and sociology and science of cognition and communication. In addition to the scientific Institute conducts educational activities, publishing and popularizing.

Directors of Institute 
Adam Schaff (1956-1968)
Jan Szczepański (1968-1975)
Tadeusz M. Jaroszewski (1976-1981)
Kazimierz Doktór (1981-1987)
Piotr Płoszajski (1988-1991)
Andrzej Rychard (1991-2000)
Henryk Domański (2000-2010)
Andrzej Rychard (2011-)

External links 
 

Institutes of the Polish Academy of Sciences